German submarine U-2515 was a Type XXI U-boat (one of the "Elektroboote") of Nazi Germany's Kriegsmarine, built for service in World War II. She was ordered on 6 November 1943, and was laid down on 28 July 1944 at the Blohm & Voss yard at Hamburg, as yard number 2515. She was launched on 22 September 1944, and commissioned under the command of Oberleutnant zur See Gerhard Linder on 19 October 1944.

Design
Like all Type XXI U-boats, U-2515 had a displacement of  when at the surface and  while submerged. The submarine was powered by two MAN SE supercharged six-cylinder M6V40/46KBB diesel engines each providing , two Siemens-Schuckert GU365/30 double-acting electric motors each providing , and two Siemens-Schuckert silent running GV232/28 electric motors each providing .

U-2515 was fitted with six  torpedo tubes in the bow and four  C/30 anti-aircraft guns. She could carry twenty-three torpedoes or seventeen torpedoes and twelve mines. The complement was five officers and fifty-two men.

Fate
U-2515 was damaged in December 1944, by a naval mine, in the Baltic Sea. She was sunk by bombs in Dock 111 in Hamburg on 17 January 1945, while damaged sections from the mine were being replaced. The wreck was later raised and broken up.

References

Bibliography

External links
 

Type XXI submarines
U-boats commissioned in 1944
U-boats sunk in 1945
World War II submarines of Germany
1944 ships
Ships built in Hamburg
Maritime incidents in December 1944
Maritime incidents in January 1945